Carey Baptist College is a Bible and theological college for training in mission, ministry, and formation based in Auckland, New Zealand.
It is the theological college of the Baptist Churches of New Zealand.

The college was founded in 1924 as New Zealand Baptist Theological College. It held its first classes in 1926, originally training men to be ministers for Baptist churches in New Zealand. Its first principal was J.J. North.

The college was renamed in 1992 to Carey Baptist College after the English Baptist missionary William Carey.

References

Bibliography 

Christianity in Auckland
Educational institutions established in 1924
Bible colleges
Seminaries and theological colleges in New Zealand
Buildings and structures in Auckland
Education in Auckland
Organisations based in Auckland
1924 establishments in New Zealand
Baptist Christianity in New Zealand